John Atherton (9 August 183716 May 1913)  was an explorer of the Far North Queensland area of Queensland, Australia.

Childhood and early life
He was born in Lancashire, England and was the second son of nine children of Edmund Atherton, a yeoman farmer of Black Rod Farm, Wigan, Lancashire and his wife Esther, née Ainscough.

Emigration to Australia
He arrived in Sydney, at the age of 7, during 1844 on the brig Briton with his parents and his 6 siblings; James, Alice, Rebecca, Edmund, Harry and Thomas. He had two further siblings,  Esther and Richard, who were born in New South Wales.

Education and Life experiences in New South Wales

He was educated in the family home,  Bald Blair, located near Armidale, New England district and gained experience in farming sheep, wheat and other mixed crops on the family property at Armidale, New South Wales.

Life in Rockhampton, Queensland

At the age of 20, he accompanied by his brother James, he over-landed sheep to the newly-opened Rockhampton district where his brother James settled, while he persuaded his father to sell the Armidale properties and join them. This second party of twenty-two persons, three horse teams, a bullock team, drays and stock was guided north by John Atherton. The journey took six months and all the agricultural implements were lost when crossing the flooded Fitzroy River (Queensland) at Yaamba, Queensland. His father settled at Mount Hedlow, whilst he settled in Bamoyea on Limestone Creek.

Marriage

During September 1862 he married Catherine, daughter of Captain W. Grainger, former superintendent of police in Belfast, Northern Ireland. The marriage took place in Rockhampton, Queensland.

Taking his bride to Woodland, near Emerald, Queensland he soon sold out and took up an adjoining property, which he named Corio.

Adventurous and courageous, the pattern of his life was already set. A noted authority on the habits and customs of the Aboriginal Australians and keenly interested in grazing land, he could not resist the lure of the unknown country to the north. He opened up the coast road to Yeppoon, Queensland with his brothers and in 1864 the road from Broadwater to Mackay, Queensland, living for a time at West Hill, between St Lawrence, Queensland and Mackay, Queensland.

Cattleman & Prospector

He found a market for his cattle by overlanding them to the Palmer River goldfield in 1873, repeating the feat when the Hodgkinson field opened in 1875. Unlike James Venture Mulligan and others, he was a cattleman first; past experiences had made him wary of mining ventures, but contrary to popular belief the ubiquitous prospecting dish attested to his interest. A brother-in-law was mining warden at Bendigo for some time. Atherton drove his Shorthorn herd north into the wilds once again, the party including his two sons aged 12 and 10, and took up Basalt Downs (Cashmere) on the headwaters of the Burdekin River, selling out after eighteen unprofitable months. Meanwhile he had explored over the ranges to the tableland country, where he finally settled at Emerald End on the banks of the Barron River, the long pilgrimage over. He remained on this property for thirty-seven years, visiting Cairns in 1877 and later shipping his cattle from Redbank, Queensland on the Cairns inlet. Many roads, including the Gillies Highway to the coast near Cairns, follow this noted pathfinder's trails and he also shortened considerably the existing road over the range from Atherton, Queensland to Herberton, Queensland. Many of his place names remain today.
Known as the 'Squire of Emerald End', he discovered tin while prospecting in 1879, joyfully naming the stream Tinaroo Creek, now the site of the storage dam for the irrigation areas of Mareeba-Dimbulah. Later he led a party to the great tin deposits known to him and thus Herberton, Queensland became established.

Founder of Mareeba

He is acknowledged as the founder of Mareeba and the headwaters of the Burdekin was named after him. Mareeba Shire Council erected a memorial to him on 17 August 1957.

Early development of the Mareeba area

He was ingenuous man with a native tendency to call a spade a spade, he insisted that he 'saw little of either place', but the speed of the area's development was greatly aided by his efforts. Unlike others, mainly transient prospectors and cedar-hunters, he was undeterred by drought, flood and the loss of his stock through Aboriginal depredations. His fine homestead, built with Chinese labour, withstood the great cyclone of 1878, and on the river flats he experimented with sugar cane and various crops. Noted for his hospitality, he erected the first building at Granite Creek in Mareeba, Queensland in 1880, his private generosity being severely overtaxed with the sudden augmentation of passing traffic.

Atherton Horses
Atherton's E.E.2 brand horses were famous throughout Australia, and in his enterprising way he also bred mules with the advent of the mines.

Discovery of Mineral Wealth and Development of the Region

The discovery of minerals caused him much personal anxiety about the future of his homestead and land. Originally in the unsettled areas as a crown lands lessee before the Act of 1884, he was still agitating for completion of arrangements in 1895 and had lost faith in promises of the government. Neither the Lands nor Mines Departments accepted responsibility for the area until eventually, after enlisting the aid of various friends, his runs were acknowledged to be under the jurisdiction of the Department of Lands.

The arrival of the railway and the closeness of the township caused him to move his stock to Nyechum, Queensland.

Family
Children of John and Catherine Atherton:

  Edmund Henry Atherton   (1863-1919)
  William Atherton    (1865-1940)  took up Chillagoe, Queensland, near by on the tributaries of the Mitchell River.

The discovery of copper resulted in the growth of the Chillagoe township.

  Lucy Julia Atherton    (1867-unknown), who wrote his bibliography which was published in 1969 
  Esther Annie Atherton    (1869-1962)  
  Ada Mary Atherton    (1871-unknown) 
  Kate Maud Atherton    (1873-1951) 
  John Grainger Atherton    (1875-unknown) 
  Mabel Alice Atherton    (1877-1880) 
  Ernest Albert Atherton    (1879-1954), was elected to the Queensland parliament in 1929 as member for Chillagoe, and was Secretary for Mines from 1929 to 1932.

Later life

In later life he continued to dress like an overlander and was a colourful figure, carrying all his life a facial scar, the result of a stone tomahawk thrown from ambush. President of the Turf Club in 1908, he was also patron of the Mareeba District Mining, Pastoral, Agricultural and Industrial Association. He was a member of the Church of England throughout his life.

He died at his homestead on 16 May 1913 and was buried in the family cemetery at Emerald End, Mareeba.

Legacy

His family papers collection have been preserved by the State Library of Queensland. The collection consists of a journal dated 1884, correspondence, postcards, photographs, maps, sketches, invitations, share certificates, poems, etc... also correspondence from his sister Alice and other members of his family. There are a total of 107 letters, ranging from 1877 to 1896, mainly between members of the Atherton family, describing life and conditions on Emerald End Station. There is also some of his correspondence with Robert Philip, J. Byrnes and various officials of the Queensland Government regarding land in the Mareeba District.

Biography
 
 
 Bolton, Geoffrey Curgenven. A Thousand Miles Away : A History of North Queensland to 1920. Australian National University Press, 1963 
 Votes and Proceedings (Legislative Assembly, Queensland), 1886, 2, 1113
 John Atherton family letters, 1862-1958 (State Library of Queensland)

References

External links
 The early History of Rockhampton, detailing John Atherton setting up infrastructure 
 Atherton, Queensland Government

1837 births
1913 deaths
Explorers of Queensland
People from Wigan
People from New South Wales
British emigrants to Australia